Cymatonautilus is a genus of cymatoceratids from the middle and upper Jurassic of Europe, the Middle East and Asia characterized by a robust shell with a wide umbilicus and subquadrate whorl section, slightly wider than high. The flanks and venter are flattened. The flanks have a wide lateral groove; the venter a more narrow median groove. The suture has a shallow ventral lobe and broad concave lateral lobes, crossed obliquely by sinuous ribs that produce a deep ventral sinus. The siphuncle is subcentral.

References

 Halder, K. and Bardhan, S. 1996. The fleeting genus Cymatonautilus (Nautiloidea): new record from the Jurassic Charl Formation, Kutch, India. Canadian Journal of Earth Sciences 33: 1007-1010.
 Kummel, B. 1956. Post-Triassic nautiloid genera. Bulletin of the Museum of Comparative Zoology 114(7): 320-494.
 Tintant, H. 1987. Les Nautiles du Jurassique d'Arabie Saoudite. Geobios 20: 67-159.

Prehistoric nautiloid genera
Middle Jurassic genus first appearances
Late Jurassic genus extinctions